Najwa Barakat (b. 1966, Beirut) is a Lebanese Arab novelist, journalist and film director.

Career
After achieving studies in theater (Beirut Fine Arts Institute) and cinema (French cinema Institution), she moves definitely to Paris where she works as a freelance journalist in a number of Arabic newspapers and magazines, and gathered the materials for several cultural programs produced by Radio France Internationale (RFI) and the British Broadcasting Corporation (BBC). She also prepared the first fifteen episodes of the cultural program broadcast at Aljaz, and authored several movie scripts as well as directing several documentaries.

Najwa Barakat has published six novels (five in Arabic and one in French), most of which were published by Dar al-Adab in Beirut. Some of them have obtained awards and were translated into foreign languages, among which “The bus of good people” (1996), which received the "Prize of the best literary creation of the year", by the Lebanese Cultural Forum, Paris, in 1997, and was translated into French in 2002, under the title: "Le bus des gens bien" - Stock Publisher (La Cosmoplite). The novel in French, "La locataire du Pot de fer" (the tenant), published by L’Harmattan Publisher in Paris, played on theater in France, "Winner of the First Prize" at the Amateur Theatre Festival in Amiens, France . She also translated Les Carnets de Camus I – II – III into Arabic, published by Kalima and Dar Al-Adab, Summer 2010.

In 2003, the circuit Meaddle East- Goethe Institute choose her among several Lebanese writers to represent her country in the  MIDAD Project: city's teller.

In 2009, she set up "Mohtaraf how to write a novel - for literature, theater and cinema": a permanent workshop located in Beirut, which receives young and aspiring writers of all ages and from all Arab countries, not only in the narrative field, but also in theatrical and movie script writing. Certainly, a pioneering and innovative initiative in the Arab World.

Works
The Secret Language (loughat al-sirr)
Ya-Salâm
The Tenant
The Bus of Good People (Bâs el-awâdem)
The Life and Passion of Hamad (hayât wa alâm Hamad ibn Siléneh)
The Transducer (Al-muhawwel)

References

External links
Rawafed: documentary interview Najwa Barakat "first part". Alarabiya.net
Rawafed: documentary interview Najwa Barakat "second part". Alarabiya.net

1966 births
Living people
Lebanese novelists
Lebanese women writers
French–Arabic translators